The Larue-Layman House is a two-story brick house in Elizabethtown, Kentucky, that was added to the National Register of Historic Places in 1988.

The house was originally built in 1831 as a small brick home for Jacob Warren LaRue, a member of a local pioneer family and the husband of Eliza Helm, who was the sister of Governor John LaRue Helm. Extensive remodeling was performed  for George M. Cresap, the  brick on the west and south facades and little else remain from the 1831 section. The 1860s remodeling produced an asymmetrical Italianate design.  A one-story porch with Doric columns replaced the original on the main (south) facade , a one-story addition was added to the north facade .

The house is notable example of the Italianate residences built in Elisabethtown in the 19th century.

See also

 LaRue family
 Benjamin Helm House
 Helm Place (Elizabethtown, Kentucky)
 National Register of Historic Places in Hardin County, Kentucky

References

Houses on the National Register of Historic Places in Kentucky
Houses completed in 1831
Houses in Hardin County, Kentucky
LaRue family
National Register of Historic Places in Hardin County, Kentucky
1831 establishments in Kentucky
Elizabethtown, Kentucky
Italianate architecture in Kentucky